Waddingtons was a British manufacturer of card and board games. The company was founded by John Waddington of Leeds, England and the manager, actor and playwright Wilson Barrett, under the name Waddingtons Limited.  The name was changed in 1905 to John Waddington Limited, then Waddington's House of Games, then Waddington Games, and finally just Waddingtons.

Founding and history 
The company was established as a printing business, and at first 'practically all its business related to the theatre'. It entered into game production in 1922, due to a boom in demand for playing cards around World War I. Waddingtons subsequently sold both original games (especially tie-ins for UK television programmes) and games licensed from other publishers.

Waddingtons became the UK publisher of the US Parker Brothers' Monopoly, while Parker licensed Waddingtons' Cluedo. In 1941, the British Directorate of Military Intelligence section 9 (MI9) had the company create a special edition of Monopoly for World War II prisoners of war held by the Germans. 
Hidden inside these games were maps, compasses, real money and other objects useful for escaping. They were distributed to prisoners by fake charitable organisations.

Victor Watson, the grandson of Victor Hugo Watson was its chairman from 1977 to 1993. While well known for games, they never provided more than 15% of profit; Victor continued his father Norman's emphasis on improving packaging technology, such as folding cartons and microwave trays. From the 1970s the popularity of video games hurt game sales, and after Victor's retirement, the company was bought by Hasbro in 1994.

Beginning in 1994, Christmas-themed jigsaw puzzles were released annually until 2007. The first twelve in the series depicted a scene from a Victorian-era Christmas. The final puzzle depicted a scene from the fairy tale Cinderella. The small number of puzzles, combined with them being limited editions, has made these puzzles highly collectable. Further jigsaws have been produced since 2010 by a new company, using the same brand name.

Games
Among the games published by Waddingtons were:

 4000 A.D.
 Air Charter
 Astron
 Battle
 Battle of the Little Big Horn
 Bewitched
 Bigfoot
 Black Box
 Blast Off!
 Blockbusters (standard, Junior, Gold Run card game, and Super- 2nd edition game with Gold Run included)
 Boggle
 Buccaneer
 Campaign
 Camelot
 Careers
 Cluedo (1949)
 Don't Miss The Boat
 Escape from Atlantis
 Equals
 Exploration
 Formula One
 Game of Nations
 Go (not the Chinese game of Weiqi, but based on world travel)
 Golfwinks
 Grade Up to Elite Cow 
 Key to the Kingdom
 Keyword
 Kimbo
 Lexicon (1932)
 Lose Your Shirt
 Lost Valley of the Dinosaurs
 Major Battles and Campaigns of General George S. Patton (1973)
 Make-Shift (1980)
 Milestones
 Monopoly
 Mine a Million (rebranded as The Business Game)
 Purple People Eater
 Railroader
 Ratrace
 Rich Uncle (board game)
 Risk
 Safari Round Up
 Scoop!
 Sorry!
 Speculate (Share Trading game)
 Spy Ring
 Subbuteo
 Tens (variation of Triominoes)
 Tour of London
 Twelve Days of Christmas Super Delux Double sides Puzzle
 Top Trumps
 Totopoly
 Ulcers
 The Vampire Game
 Whot!

References

External links 

Waddingtons Playing Cards - a Brief history
Waddingtons Board Game Archive

Card game publishing companies
Board game publishing companies
Playing card manufacturers
Companies based in Leeds
History of Leeds
Companies disestablished in 1995